Houshang Golmakani is an Iranian journalist, film critic and director. He was born in Gorgan on March 23, 1954. Houshang Golmakani started his professional career in 1972 as a journalist and film critic for Tehran Economist. He graduated in cinema and television from the College of Dramatic Arts of Tehran in 1982.

He is one of the three founders of Film (Iranian magazine), the oldest post-revolutionary film magazine in Iran (founded in 1982 with Massoud Mehrabi and Abbas Yari). In 1993, Film (Iranian magazine) began to print an English version of the magazine for its international readers, FILM International, the only English magazine solely about Iranian cinema.

Houshang Golmakani is also a writer and a director. He directed a documentary about the life and works of Mohsen Makhmalbaf,  STARDUST-STRICKEN; Mohsen Makhmalbaf: A Portrait (1996). He writes books about cinema and translate screenplays.

Works

Translation of screenplays 
Houshang Golmakani has translated over 14 screenplays including the following:
 Paris, Texas (1st edition: 1989;2d  edition:1997; 3d edition: 2002)
 The White Sheik, Variety Lights (1992)
 La Strada (1995)
 La Notte (1997)
 Cinema Paradiso (1999)

Books/Other publications
 The Gentleman Actor (1st edition: 1997; 2d edition:2010)
 The Sound of Music (2000)
 From Sam Alley
 Tangna (Narrow), book (2007)
 
 

Houshang Golmakan was also the producer and director of the film Stardust Stricken, Mohsen Makhmalbaf: A Portrait in 1996.

Contributions as a Jury 
 Member of FIPRESCI jury at the Libzick documentary film festival, 1998 
 Member of jury at the Tbilissi film festival, 2007
 Member of NETPAC jury at Antalya film festival, 2007
 Member of jury at Didar film festival, Dushanbe, Tajikistan, 2008
 Member of NETPAC (Network for Promotion of Asian Cinema)
 Member of selection committee for foreign movies, International Fajr festival, Tehran, (1998–2002)
 Member of jury of the 32nd Fajr Film Festival, 2013
 Member of jury for a foreign film, Fajr International Festival, 2017
 Member of jury of the 2nd American Sheid Film Festival, 2017

Awards
 Honorary Award, Cinema House Celebration, 2007
 Best Art Critics Award, Journalists Foundation, 2008
 Award for the Most Influential Critic of the last thirty years in Iran, Art Critics Association, 2008

External links 
 Houshang Golmakani- NiemanReports.org
 FILM Magazine
 Houshang Golmakani's blog
 Tehran Times
 Houshang Golmakani's Biography
 Fipresci
 Payvand
 Golmakani Houshang at Cinema Without Borders
 Houshang Golmakani's publications list

Notes 
 

 

Iranian journalists
Iranian writers
Living people
1954 births
Iranian male short story writers
People from Gorgan